Francis William Lickfield (February 9, 1908 – December 14, 1998) was the fifth bishop of the Episcopal Diocese of Quincy.

Early life and education
Lickfield was born on February 9, 1908, in Philadelphia, to Francis William Lickfield and Mary Agnes Desmond. He studied at Temple University and then at the Philadelphia Divinity School in New York, from where he earned a Bachelor of Theology in 1933. He was awarded a Doctor of Divinity from  the Philadelphia Divinity School in 1959 and a Doctor of Sacred Theology from Nashotah House in 1959.

Ordained Ministry
Lickfield was ordained deacon in June 1933 and priest in December 1933,by Bishop Francis M. Taitt of Pennsylvania. He married Josephine Mondello on March 7, 1934, and together had two children. Between 1933 and 1934, he served as a missionary and chaplain of the House of Refuge in New York City. In 1934, he became vicar of St John's Church in Westfield, Pennsylvania, St Andrew's Church in Tioga, Pennsylvania and the Church of the Holy Spirit in Knoxville, Pennsylvania. In 1936, he became a member of the diocesan department for Christian Education, while in 1938 he became a priest of the Bush Brotherhood. Between 1936 and 1943, he also served as rector of St Paul's Church in Philipsburg, Pennsylvania. Between 1943 and 1945, he returned to New York to serve as assistant priest at the Chapel of the Intercession. In 1945 he became rector of St Matthias' Church in Waukesha, Wisconsin, while in 1948 he moved to Chicago to become rector of the Church of the Redeemer, a post he held till 1948.

Bishop
In May 1958, Lickfield was elected Bishop of Quincy during a diocesan convention. He was consecrated on September 20, 1958, in St John's Cathedral, Quincy, Illinois. He retired on June 30, 1973.

References

1908 births
1998 deaths
20th-century Anglican bishops in the United States
Temple University alumni
Episcopal bishops of Quincy